Sadeqabad-e Sagbu (also Romanized as Şādeqābād-e Sagbū) is a village in Qaleh-ye Khvajeh Rural District, in the Central District of Andika County, Khuzestan Province, Iran. At the 2006 census, its population was 194, in 33 families.

References 

Populated places in Andika County